Henry Smith (1620–1668) was an English Member of Parliament and one of the regicides of King Charles I.

He was born in Withcote, Leicestershire in 1620; son of Henry Smith born in 1589 and Frideswide (Fritzjoyce) Wright.   He studied at Oxford University and Lincoln's Inn.  He married miss Holland.

In 1640 he was elected MP for Leicestershire. In January 1649, as a commissioner of the High Court of Justice for the trial of Charles I at the trial of King Charles, he was 19th of the 59 signatories on the death warrant of the King.

After the Restoration in 1660 he was brought to trial for regicide and was sentenced to death. He successfully appealed the sentence which was then commuted to life imprisonment. He was held at the Tower of London until 1664, and was then transported to Jersey where he is thought to have died in 1668 in Mont Orgueil castle.

References
Biography of Henry Smith, regicide British Civil Wars website.

External links

1620 births
1668 deaths
English MPs 1640–1648
Regicides of Charles I
Prisoners who died in Jersey detention
Prisoners in the Tower of London
English politicians convicted of crimes
People from Harborough District
Members of the Parliament of England for Leicestershire